Dead and Buried is the third studio album by the American death metal band Jungle Rot, released by Olympic Recordings on February 6, 2001. It was reissued in 2005 by Coyote Records for Russian distribution.

Track listing

Personnel
David Matrise: vocals/guitar
Jim Bell: guitar
Chris Djuricic: bass guitar
Jim Garcia: drums
Chris "Wisco" Djuricic: producer

External links

Jungle Rot albums
2001 albums
Season of Mist albums